Philips Park may refer to:

 Philips Park, Prestwich, England
 Philips Park, Clayton, England